The 1960 Temple Owls football team was an American football team that represented Temple University as a member of the Middle Atlantic Conference (MAC) during the 1960 NCAA College Division football season. In its first season under head coach George Makris, the team compiled a 2–7 record (0–5 against MAC opponents) and finished seventh out of eight teams in the MAC's University Division. The team played its home games at Temple Stadium in Philadelphia.

Joe Nejman, Lou Paludi, and Wally Porter were assistant coaches.

Schedule

References

Temple
Temple Owls football seasons
Temple Owls football